The 1925–26 Prima Divisione season, its final season, was won by Juventus.

Northern League

Regular season
Udinese and Parma FC had been promoted from the Second Division.

Goal average was introduced eliminating the tie-breakers.

The Northern League decided to create the Serie A with 16 teams starting in 1926, so the last four teams of each group should be relegated.

However, just after the end of the regular season the fascists postponed thus project under protests of Southern clubs which would be excluded. They imposed a National Division of two groups instead, and all relegated clubs entered into an extraordinary qualification for the new tournament.

Group A

Classification

Results table

Group B

Classification

Results table

Finals

Tie-break
Played on August 1, 1926, in Milan.

Juventus qualified for the National Finals.

Southern League

The Southern League was a separate amatorial league, still divided in five regions. The winner were Alba Rome.

National Finals
1st leg Date: 8 August 1926, 2nd leg Date: 22 August 1926

Top goalscorers

Qualification to the National Division

Round 1
Played on August 29

Round 2
Played on September 5

Round 3
Played on September 12

Repetition
Played on September 19 in Turin

Alessandria was qualified to the National Division.

References and sources
Almanacco Illustrato del Calcio - La Storia 1898-2004, Panini Edizioni, Modena, September 2005

Footnotes

Serie A seasons
Italy
Prima